Highland High School is a public high school in Ault, Colorado, United States.

History

Scenes from the 1977 film One on One were filmed at the school.

Campus

Curriculum

Highland High School students can take vocational classes at Aims Community College.

Athletics
 Baseball
 Basketball
 Girls' basketball
 Cross country
 Football
 Track and field
 Volleyball
 Cheerleading
Students can go to Eaton High School for softball and swimming.

References

External links

Public high schools in Colorado
Schools in Weld County, Colorado